Saadaram (also spelled as Sadaram) is a 1995 Malayalam film directed by Jose Thomas and stars Suresh Gopi, Lalu Alex, Geetha, Suvarna Mathew, Chithra, Sreenath, Kaviyoor Ponnamma and Sukumari main roles.  The script was written by A. K. Lohithadas. The film was big hit at Box office. The film was dubbed into Tamil as Mr. Deva.

Plot
Though a lawyer by profession, Raghunandan Menon finds happiness in farming. He leads a happy life along with his family consisting of mother, elder brother, and his family. Raghunandan's fiancee Lekha is a research student in literature.  One night, on a usual walk through his farm, Raghu saves a severely wounded girl. On the next morning, she introduces herself as Seethalakshmi and informs him that she was brutally raped by gang of men, who later dumped her. Raghu offers her shelter in  his farmhouse for next couple of days. Lekha, who happened to make a surprise visit finds Sethu in the farmhouse, whom she mistakes to be having an affair with Raghu. His explanations fail to convince her. Up on knowing about a girl staying at the farmhouse, Harinandan Menon, the elder brother, who is also a senior police officer arrives at the farmhouse. He is shocked to see Seethalakshmi and returns suddenly without saying anything. Seetha explains Raghu that Hari was one among those men who raped her. On reaching home to know more about the incident, Hari confesses of his mistake and tries to justify that he was in an inebriated condition. But Raghu is adamant of giving justice to Seetha. Raghu in attempt of bringing justice to Seetha faces severe opposition from within his house including his mom, fiancee and sister-in law. Upon knowing that Seetha is a rape victim, Madhavan her fiance shows his unwillingness to accept her. In order to give a new life to her, Raghu marries Seetha and brings her to his house. But at home, he is asked by his sister-in law not to bring Seetha inside. Raghu takes Seetha and drives away.

Cast

 Suresh Gopi as Adv.Raghunandan Menon
 Lalu Alex as DySP Harichandra Menon
 Geetha as Seethalakshmi
 Kaviyoor Ponnamma as Bhanumathi
 Chithra as Malathi
 Sivaji as Gangadharan Menon
 Madhupal as Nazar
 Sreenath as Ravichandra Menon
 Mammukoya as Veerappan (Kunjalu)
 Priyanka Anoop as Dakshayani
 Bindu Panikkar as Rama
 Suvarna Mathew as Lekha
 Spadikam George as 
 Ravi Vallathol as Madhavan
 Kozhikode Narayanan Nair as Sankara Warrier
 Sonia Baiju as Jessy
 Anila Sreekumar as Kallu
 Reshmi Soman as Sreekutty
 Devi S as Arya

Soundtrack
"Madhuchandrike (male)" - K. J. Yesudas
"Sarathkala" - K. J. Yesudas, Sujatha Mohan 
"Ambalakkombante" - M. G. Sreekumar
"Madhuchandrike (female)" - Swarnalatha

Box office
This film was big hit at box office. It ran more 100 days successfully in theatres.

References

Sources

External links
 Saadaram at the Internet Movie Database

Films with screenplays by A. K. Lohithadas
Films directed by Jose Thomas
1995 films
1990s Malayalam-language films
Films scored by Johnson